Herpetogramma emphatica is a moth in the family Crambidae. It was described by Harrison Gray Dyar Jr. in 1926. It is found in Mexico.

References

Moths described in 1926
Herpetogramma
Moths of Central America